Pontypridd Rugby Football Club are a rugby union team from Pontypridd, Rhondda Cynon Taf, Wales. They compete in the Indigo Group Premiership, which they won for four consecutive seasons between 2012 and 2015, and the WRU National Cup, which they have won on 6 occasions, with the most recent being in 2014.

Established in 1876, Pontypridd RFC play their home games on the banks of the River Rhondda, at Sardis Road, Pontypridd, Rhondda Cynon Taf in Wales, with their age-grade section playing at Taff Vale Park in Pontypridd, and Pontypridd High School Fields in nearby Cilfynydd.

Pontypridd RFC experienced a successful period during the 1990s under head coach, Dennis John, referred to as the club's "Golden Age", and enjoyed further success between 2001 and 2003 with the appointment of head coach, Lynn Howells. The transition to Regional Rugby in Wales in 2003 saw the downgrading of Pontypridd to a semi-professional team, followed by financial difficulties for the club, and eventual demise of Pontypridd's "Celtic Warriors" region.

Pontypridd RFC have since refinanced and restructured, and, despite a mooted stadium sale, continue to be regarded as a beacon for rugby in the south Wales Valleys.

Pontypridd RFC have produced numerous players for the Wales national rugby union team and have long thrived on the 'unfashionable club' tag.

Club history

Early history
Pontypridd RFC are generally accepted to have been formed in 1876 by a number of young local men who had moved into the area during the Industrial Revolution of the late 19th century. However, the first reported match involving Pontypridd was played on 18 December 1873 against Roath (Cardiff). They were represented at a meeting in Tenby in 1880 that would later lead to the formation of the Welsh Rugby Union in 1881 and had a player, Edward Treharne, named in the very first Welsh International side also in 1881, who also played for Cowbridge Grammar School as a student. Pontypridd supplied two more players to the Welsh team before the turn of the century, Tom Williams and Ernie George.

In their early days, Pontypridd RFC played their home games at Taff Vale Park in Treforest, the current home of their junior section, before moving to the People's Park alongside the River Rhondda. However, in 1908 they moved once more to a new home in Ynysyngharad Park in Pontypridd itself, where they would stay for 65 years.

1945–1989
Pontypridd have long been regarded as one of the more unfashionable Welsh clubs, and during this period were over-shadowed by the more prominent Welsh clubs, Llanelli, Swansea, Neath, Cardiff and Newport, known collectively as the Big Five. Players with Pontypridd often found it hard to break into the international team while at the club, meaning a number would leave for higher profile teams each season. Despite this the club were consistently successful, achieving a long line of top ten finishes in the unofficial Welsh league, a competition they won for the first time in the 1962/1963 season.

However the 1970s would bring Pontypridd its first period of real success. Following the redevelopment of the A470 trunk road near their home ground, the team moved to its current home of Sardis Road in Pontypridd in 1974. This move was immediately followed by success in the unofficial league championship, winning it in 1975–76, 1977–78 and 1978–79 whilst never falling from the top four for seven years under the captaincy of two of Pontypridd's greatest ever players – Bob Penberthy and Tommy David.

1990–2002
The 1990s saw a huge change in Welsh rugby, especially with the inauguration of the first official Welsh leagues in 1990. Pontypridd were placed in the top (first) division for that season and have never yet been out of the top-level in the Welsh game. They consistently finished in the top five, which was considered an achievement due to the stature and pedigree of the clubs they finished among. Third places in 1991–92, 1993–94 and 1995–96 plus a runner up finish to Cardiff RFC in 1994–95 was a promising return for the club.

During the 1993–94 season there was speculation about an Anglo-Welsh competition containing only the 'Big Four' Welsh clubs of Cardiff, Neath, Swansea and Llanelli. Pontypridd's 27–12 victory over Neath in November was considered to have made the case for a 'Big Five', and coach Dennis John expressed pleasure at having put an end to such speculation later in the season following a narrow defeat to Cardiff in the Welsh Cup semi-final.

In 1996 the club won its first official major honour, beating Neath RFC in the final of the Welsh Cup, a match still considered one of the best ever. They repeated this achievement again in 2002 and 2006. The following season (1997) saw them win the Welsh League, narrowly over the same opponents. Both of these successes were obtained by what many consider Pontypridd's best ever team, led by Nigel Bezani and including players such as Richie Collins, Neil Jenkins, Paul John and Dale McIntosh.

During the 2001–02 season, Pontypridd enjoyed an incredibly successful campaign, winning the Principality Cup and narrowly losing to Sale Sharks in the final of the Parker Pen Shield competition.

From then until 2003 Pontypridd consistently finished in the top five of the league but failed to challenge for top spot (and to qualify for the Heineken Cup – Europe's top tournament) as they struggled to cope with the added financial pressures of the newly professional game, losing a number of players to larger clubs and relying heavily upon their much admired youth academy system. However, in 2003 the Welsh Rugby Union would change the game in Wales forever with the advent of Welsh Regional Rugby.

2003–present

After much negotiation and rumour of a merger with local rivals Cardiff RFC, Pontypridd finally found themselves in a partnership with Bridgend RFC, forming the Celtic Warriors that would represent the whole of the South Wales Valleys region.

However financial difficulties at Pontypridd lead the team to sell its stake in the Warriors to Bridgend RFC benefactor Leighton Samuel and all games were moved away from Sardis Road before the club was controversially dissolved by the WRU in the summer of 2004.

They were then reformed as Ponty Rugby Ltd playing at a semi professional level in the newly formed Welsh Premiership and unpopularly placed under the umbrella of local rivals Cardiff Blues by the WRU, Pontypridd continue to be the top team in the Glamorganshire south Wales Valleys and are considered by many of their fans to be the Valleys' regional representative side, with Cardiff still perceived by the residents of the Valleys as rivals.

In 2005 Pontypridd were beaten finalists in the WRU Challenge Cup, narrowly losing to Llanelli 24–25, having been leading 24–8 with only 10 minutes remaining until a former Pontypridd player Neil Boobyer was brought into the game and helped turn them game around in Llanelli's favour.

The following year they would surpass their previous season's record as Saturday 6 May 2006 Pontypridd beat Neath 26–25 to win the WRU Challenge Cup (then called the Konica Minolta Cup, and currently called the SWALEC Cup after the sponsors of the tournament) in a well fought final at the Millennium Stadium. Neath were pre-match favourites having recently secured the Welsh Premier league by a large points margin, and going into the game chasing a league and cup 'double'. This was a replay of the classic 1996 final, when Pontypridd had also stopped Neath RFC 'doing the double'.

17 May 2008 saw Pontypridd enter a repeat performance against Neath at the Millennium Stadium. The score, however, was not to be repeated, as Neath beat Pontypridd 28–22.

In 2010–11 the Swalec Cup was secured after victory over Aberavon, 35–24 at the Millennium Stadium and Ponty finished in first place in the Principality Premiership with 107 points but with play-offs to crown the overall league champions introduced they lost in the final at Sardis Road against 3rd placed Llanelli to deny Ponty a historic double, reaching the Semi-Finals of the British & Irish Cup before losing to eventual winners Bristol was also a fine achievement.

The club again reached two finals the following season, losing to Cross Keys in the final of the Swalec Cup 32–19 on 7 May 2012 before being crowned Welsh Champions for the first time in 15 years after a second successive first-place finish in the Principality Premiership this time led to a Play-Off final win over Llanelli at Sardis Road on 18 May. The club also made the Quarter-Finals of the British & Irish Cup, losing away to Leinster 'A'.

The 2012–13 season was arguably the most successful in the club's history as Ponty won an historic league and cup double. First beating Neath in the final of the Swalec Cup on 4 May 2013, 34–13 and then after finishing 23 points clear in the Principality Premiership with 21 wins from 22 matches they secured the title in style by defeating Llanelli in the Play-Off Final at Sardis Road on 18 May by 47–15.

The 2013–14 season saw Ponty repeat their success of the previous year, winning an unprecedented Double Double, claiming the Swalec Cup on 4 May 2014 against Cross Keys at the Millennium Stadium by 21–8, and after finishing top of the Principality Premiership for the fourth successive season, a third league title in a row was secured on 18 May 2014 with 38–17 victory over Cross Keys in the Play-Off Final at Sardis Road. The club also defeated London Welsh, London Scottish and Cornish Pirates on the way to the British & Irish Cup Semi-Finals before exiting the competition against Leinster 'A' following a defeat on try count following a 22–22 draw. The 2014–15 saw Ponty reach a fifth successive Swalec Cup final before going down to a surprise defeat by Bridgend, while a fifth successive 1st-place finish in the Principality Premiership led to a fourth league title in a row after a 28–14 victory over Ebbw Vale at Sardis Road on 17 May 2015 in the play-off final.

Despite remaining successful at the highest level attainable by a non-regional side, Pontypridd RFC has seen a huge loss in their fan base due to the disenfranchisement of Welsh rugby supporters in the Valleys over to the appointment of Cardiff Blues as their 'regional' team. Yet despite this, Pontypridd's hardcore support base remains one of the biggest club followings in Wales

Pontypridd RFC continue to earn plaudits for the incredible contribution they have made to International Rugby. Former Pontypridd players seen wearing the red of Wales in recent years include Gethin Jenkins, Kevin Morgan, Richard Parks, Michael Owen, Martyn Williams, Dafydd James, Mefin Davies, Brent Cockbain, Robert Sidoli, Sonny Parker, Ceri Sweeney, Ian Evans, Matthew Rees, Morgan Stoddart, Cory Hill, Kristian Dacey, Seb Davies, Dillon Lewis, Tomos Williams and Jarrod Evans.

Club shield

The club shield denotes the town of Pontypridd's famous arched bridge – once the largest single-span bridge in Europe – built by William Edwards in 1756 and known as the "Old Bridge".

The chevrons are an interpretation of the ancient arms of Iestyn ap Gwrgant, the last ruler of the Kingdom of Morgannwg. The de Clare family – Norman Lords of the Welsh Marches, under whose authority the ancient shire of Glamorgan was placed – used a similar design to Gwrgant's arms. Both sets of chevrons were once seen on the coat of arms of Mid Glamorgan County Council, in which the town of Pontypridd was situated prior to the Local Government Act of 1994.

An identical chevron design is now seen in the coat of arms of Rhondda Cynon Taf County Borough Council, which superseded Mid Glamorgan.

The black and white colours are the team colours of Pontypridd RFC.

Sponsorship 

Pontypridd's most notable main sponsor was local company, Buy As You View. The company began life as Just Rentals in Tonypandy in 1976, and sponsored Pontypridd RFC from the early nineties until 2004. It employed numerous former players, including Neil Jenkins and Lee Beach and ran the Buy As You View Schools Rugby Initiative, working in partnership with Pontypridd RFC.

Pontypridd's main sponsor from 2004 to 2009 was Pontypridd-based environmental and waste management company, Egan Waste Services.

In 2009, Pontypridd-based company Amber Electrical become the club's main sponsors in a highly publicised partnership deal.

2010 saw Egan Waste Services step up their support of Pontypridd by becoming the club's main sponsors once more.

Club kit has been supplied by numerous firms, including Umbro, Hogger Sports, Cica, Rossco, Canterbury of New Zealand, Kukri Sports, Errea, Rhino Rugby and Mizuno. Kappa became the club's kit suppliers for the start of the 2018–19 season.

Statistics

Club honours
Welsh Premier Division Champions – 1996–97, 2011–12, 2012–13, 2013–14, 2014–15
Welsh Premier Division Runners Up – 1994–95, 1998–99, 2010–11, 2015–16
WRU Merit Table Champions – 1975–76
WRU Merit Table Runners Up – 1977–78, 1978–79
Western Mail Welsh Championship Winners – 1963, 1976, 1978, 1979 
WRU National Cup Winners – 1995–96, 2001–02, 2005–06, 2010–11, 2012–13, 2013–14
WRU National Cup Runners Up – 1978–79, 1994–95, 2004–05, 2007–08, 2011–12, 2014–15, 2016–17
WRU Premiership Challenge Cup Winners – 2015–16
WRU Challenge Trophy Winners – 1997–98
WRU Challenge Trophy Runners-Up – 1998–99
WRU Champions Challenge Winners – 1996
European Rugby Shield Runners Up – 2001–02
European Rugby Shield Semi-Finalists – 2002–03
British & Irish Cup Semi-Finalists – 2010–11, 2013–14
WRU National 7s Tournament Winners – 2013
WRU National 7s Tournament Runners Up – 2014, 2015
Abercynon 7s Tournament Winners – 2008, 2009, 2010
Abercwmboi 7s Tournament Winners – 2017

Welsh Leagues

Cup Final history

Team Management, Players & Former Players

Team Management
Pontypridd RFC have been led by a number of high-profile coaches since the 1980s, Clive Jones – a prominent figure in Treorchy RFC's 1993/94 Heineken League successes – was instrumental in ensuring Pontypridd's place in the top tier during the latter part of the eighties.

In 1992, Dennis John took over as head coach, assisted by former Pontypridd flanker, Lynn Howells, and led Pontypridd into what is widely regarded as their "Golden Age", with Ponty winning the Welsh Cup Final in the 1995–96 season, and winning the Welsh Premier League in the 1996–97 season.

With the departure of John in 1999, former Pontypridd and Wales flanker, Richie Collins became head coach, and while some significant scalps – notably a win over Heineken Cup winners Leicester in 2000 – came his way, his tenure in charge was short-lived.

In September 2001, Clive Jones rejoined Pontypridd as director of rugby, and had, by December 2001, brought Lynn Howells back from Cardiff, who then proceeded to marshal the club to become Principality Cup winners in May 2002 and guided the team to the final of the Parker Pen European Shield days later.
The advent of Regional Rugby in 2003 saw Howells depart to become coach of parent-region, the Celtic Warriors, with former Pontypridd flanker, Justin Burnell filling the void.

Burnell's departure in 2004 was followed by the appointment of former Pontypridd flanker, Simon King who, along with assistant coach, former Pontypridd and Wales captain and scrum-half Paul John, guided Pontypridd to the final of the Konica Minolta Cup in 2004–05, before winning it in 2005–06.

Paul John took over as head coach in at the commencement of the 2006–07 season, and, assisted by former Pontypridd and Wales back row, Dale McIntosh, led the club to the final of the Konica Minolta Cup in 2007/08.

During May 2010, it was decided that Paul John and Dale McIntosh would switch roles, as the demands on John in his capacity as head coach of the Wales Sevens team were becoming too great. Dale McIntosh therefore leads Pontypridd into the 2010–11 season as head coach, while Paul John assumes the mantle of assistant coach.

McIntosh left his role in October 2013 to take up a full-time position with the Cardiff Blues, leading to a restructure of the Pontypridd coaching team with Paul John as head coach, being backed up by Gareth Wyatt and Geraint Lewis with another former Wales international Garin Jenkins also joining the backroom staff. After playing his part in continuing the club's success, Lewis has since departed to become a full-time WRU skills coach being replaced as forwards coach by another former Pontypridd player in Robert Sidoli.

Justin Burnell returned to Pontypridd as director of rugby in the summer of 2017, replacing the previous coaching team of John and Sidoli, whilst Paul Matthews replaced Wyatt, who departed to join up with the Wales Women's team the following year.

The current team manager is former Pontypridd player, Dan Godfrey, and the Forwards coach is Lee Davies.

Current Coaching Staff

Notable former management staff
  Billy Griffiths (coach)
  Clive Jones (coach & director of rugby)
  Dennis John (coach)
  Lynn Howells (coach & assistant coach)
  Steve Richards (fitness coach)
  Richie Collins (coach)
  Justin Burnell (coach)
  Simon King (coach)
  Steele Lewis (assistant coach)
  Mike Griffiths (scrum coach)
  Nigel Bezani (team manager)
  Eddie Jones (team manager)
  Gary Jones (team manager)
  Dale McIntosh (coach)
 Geraint Lewis (forwards coach)
  Garin Jenkins (scrum coach)
  Rob Sidoli (forwards coach)
  Richard Langmead (team manager)
  Gareth Wyatt (assistant coach)
  Darren Bool (strength & conditioning coach)

Players

Current squad

International players

Senior International Players
 Chris Dicomidis
 Niko Matawalu

Senior International Sevens Players
 Cally James
 Dale Stuckey

Under 20 International Players
 Cally James
 Aled Ward

Former players

  Duncan Bell
  Nigel Bezani
  Dane Blacker
  Tom Billups
  Neil Boobyer
  Billy Boston
  Aled Brew
  Jonathan Bryant
  Brent Cockbain
  Richie Collins
  Kristian Dacey
  Brett Davey
  Tommy David
  Mefin Davies
  Seb Davies
  Ian Evans
  Jarrod Evans
  Dai Flanagan
  Ian Gough
  Graham Gittins
  Mason Grady
  Mike Griffiths
  Cory Hill
  Sam Hobbs
  Dafydd James
  Lee Jarvis
  Ellis Jenkins
  Gethin Jenkins
  Neil Jenkins
  Phil John
  Paul John
  Will-Griff John
  Gary Jones
  Paul Knight
  Dillon Lewis
  Geraint Lewis
  Steele Lewis
  Shane Lewis-Hughes
  Nicky Little
  Christian Loader
  Dafydd Lockyer
  Jan Machacek
  Jonathan Mason
  Dale McIntosh
  Kevin Morgan
  Matthew Nutthall
  Wayne O'Connor
  Michael Owen
  Sonny Parker
  Richard Parks
  Bob Penberthy
  Greg Prosser
  Matthew Rees
  Pat Riordan
  Russell Robins
  Mark Rowley
  Matthew Screech
  Rhys Shellard
  Robert Sidoli
  Morgan Stoddart
  Nathan Strong
  Ceri Sweeney
  Christian Martin
  Edward Treharne
  Fe'ao Vunipola
  Tomos Williams
  Martyn Williams
  Gareth Wyatt
  Thomas Young

Club Captains

 1876–1877 James Spickett
 1877–1879 Henry Briscoe
 1880–1881 David Treharne
 1883–1884 William Spickett
 1894–1895 Ernest George
 1895–1896 Jack Morgan
 1898–1899 Billy Rees
 1900–? Rowley Thomas
 1906–1907 Duncan McGregor
 1911–? Frank Hawkins
 1920 W R Thomas
 1928–1929 Dick Elliott
 1945–1947 Jeff Scott
 1947–1948 Len Arnold
 1948–1949 Viv Jenkins/Dennis Prater/Tom Hughes
 1949–1950 Des Jones
 1950–1951 Des Jones/Roy Roberts
 1951–1952 Des Jones
 1952–1953 Bobby Narbett
 1953–1954 Gordon Matthews
 1954–1955 Gordon Matthews
 1955–1958 Russell Robins
 1958–1959 Jock Watkins
 1959–1960 T Brian "Shrimp" Williams
 1960–1962 Graham Gittins
 1962–1964 Eddie Jones
 1964–1965 Russell Jones
 1965–1966 Tommy Coombes
 1966–1967 Byron Broadstock/Tommy Coombes
 1967–1968 Joe Smith
 1968–1969 Arfon Jones
 1969–1970 Joe Smith
 1970–1971 Bob Penberthy
 1971–1973 Dennis John
 1973–1974 Wayne Evans
 1974–1975 Bill Davey
 1975–1977 Bob Penberthy
 1977–1981 Tommy David
 1981–1982 Robin Morgan
 1982–1983 Mike Alexander
 1983–1984 Bob Dyer
 1984–1985 John O'Callaghan
 1985–1987 Kerry Williams
 1987–1988 Phil John
 1988–1990 Ceri Jones
 1990–1991 Paul Knight
 1991–1992 Steele Lewis
 1992–1996 Nigel Bezani
 1996–1999 Neil Jenkins
 1999–2000 Dale McIntosh
 2000–2001 Paul John
 2001–2002 Dale McIntosh
 2002–2003 Mefin Davies
 2003–2004 Dale McIntosh
 2004–2005 Paul Matthews
 2005–2006 Dale McIntosh
 2006–2010 Nathan Strong
 2010–2013 Chris Dicomidis
 2014–2021 Dafydd Lockyer
 2021-2022 Morgan Sieniawksi
 2022-     Kristian Parker

Games played against international opposition

Pontypridd youth and junior teams
With the loss of their extremely successful Academy set up that was handed over to their Cardiff rivals by the WRU, Pontypridd RFC re-formed a Youth side in 2006, coached by Sean Oliver and Wayne Gristock (formerly Porth Harlequins RFC).

Starting in the bottom division of the Blues league, the side made notable progress that saw them punch well above their weight and earn the nickname the 'Upstarts', when after hugely successful first season that saw them promoted seven divisions to the BB League (Blues Second Division).

The following season saw the formation of a second Youth team who again had to start in the bottom league and were coached by former Pontypridd players Dai Legge and Mike Kelleher. By the end of the 2007/8 season both youth teams had won their perspective leagues outright and earned automatic promotion, with the senior youth now playing in the top division in only their third season since forming. Several youth players have gained notable honours, including representative honours with Welsh Crawshays and Welsh Schoolboys, with players in the Cardiff Blues Academy and several older players now training with Pontypridd RFC's senior team.

Behind this successful youth setup is the Pontypridd Mini & Junior Section that was formed in 1997, the section started out with just a handful of junior players and volunteer coaches, but has grown into one of the biggest and most successful junior sections in Wales. The section contains every age group from under 7s to under 16s, with the youth sides containing players under the age of 19; with almost 300 young players in their ever-swelling ranks. The section is hugely successful, winning dozens of tournaments and trophies each season, and competing successfully in international tournaments throughout Europe where they have won every foreign tournament they have entered.

At the commencement of the 2008–09 season, it was decided that both Senior and Junior Youth teams would merge, forming a large and capable new Pontypridd Youth section. The new season will see a single squad of 35 players being selected, playing in the 2008–09 RAF Youth League: Blues Region. The squad is coached by Wayne Gristock and Sean Oliver, and managed by Chris Kingsbury MBE.

Prior to the commencement of the 2010–11 season, notification was given of a major change in the running of the Youth section, as it was decided that the section would transfer from the hands of the Mini & Junior Rugby section, and would instead fall under the remit of the senior Team Management. The hope is to discover new stars of the future, who will regularly train alongside the main body of the senior XV, echoing the past achievements of the Pontypridd Youth setup in bringing Michael Owen, Gethin Jenkins and Ceri Sweeney, amongst others, to the attention of the World.

See also
Celtic Warriors
Pro14
Heineken Cup
Parker Pen European Shield
British and Irish Cup
Principality Premiership
SWALEC Cup

References

External links
Ponty.net Official website
Ponty Rugby Unofficial website
TerraceTalk Pontypridd Rugby supporters' forum
PontyKids Pontypridd Mini and Junior Rugby
PontyYouth Pontypridd Academy and development rugby

Bibliography
 
 

 
Rugby clubs established in 1876
Welsh rugby union teams
Sport in Rhondda Cynon Taf
1876 establishments in Wales